, formerly known as Shōnen Sunday Super,  is a monthly shōnen manga magazine published by Shogakukan in Japan.

History and background
Originally billed as a special edition of Weekly Shōnen Sunday, titled , it was renamed  in 1995. It is often the home of short term serials by established Shogakukan artists, as well as a place to break in new, up-and-coming Japanese manga artist. In April 2004 the magazine switched from being published monthly to bi-monthly. In March 2009, it changed back to the monthly basis. In January 2012, the magazine changed its name to simply Shōnen Sunday S.

Series
There are currently thirteen manga series being serialized in Shōnen Sunday S.

Past series

1978–1989
 – Buronson (story) and Kaoru Shintani (art) (1978–1984)
 – Mitsuru Adachi (1978–1980)
 – Kei Satomi (1981–1985)
 – Tsuguo Okazaki (1981–1984)
 – Tetsu Kariya (story) and Kazuhiko Shimamoto (art) (1982–1986)
 – Noboru Rokuda (1982)
 – Osamu Ishiwata (1983–1984)
 – Mitsuo Hashimoto (1983–1984)
 – Kōichirō Yasunaga (1983–1985)
 – Takeshi Miya (1984–1985)
 – Rumiko Takahashi (1984–1985) (infrequently published in Weekly Shōnen Sunday)
 – Yuki Masami (1985–1988) (re-launched in Weekly Young Sunday in 2002)
 – Katsu Aki (1985–1987)
 – Johji Manabe (1986–1989)
 – Kei Kusunoki (1986–1990)
 – Gosho Aoyama (1987–1988) (infrequently published in Weekly Shōnen Sunday)
 – Toshiyuki Tanabe (story) and Yu Nakahara (art) (1988)
 – Hiroyuki Nishimori (moved to Weekly Shōnen Sunday) (1988–1990)
 – Takuya Mitsuda (moved to Weekly Shōnen Sunday) (1988–1989)
 – Harumi Matsuzaki (1989–1990)
 – Kenichi Muraeda (1989–1993)

1990–2003
 – Takashi Shiina (1990–1991)
 – Johji Manabe (1990)
 – Kōji Kiriyama (1991) (moved to Weekly Shōnen Sunday)
 – Takashi Shiina (1991–1992)
 – Gosho Aoyama (1991–1993)
 – Kei Kusunoki (1991–2001)
 – Kōichirō Yasunaga (1992–1994)
 – Hiroshi Takashige (story) and Ryoji Minagawa (art) (moved from Weekly Shōnen Sunday) (1992–1996)
 – Yoshihiro Takahashi (1993–1995)
 – Masahiko Nakahira (1994)
 - Kyōichi Nanatsuki (story) and Yūki Miyoshi (art) (1994)
 – Kōji Kumeta (1994–2002)
 – Naoya Matsumori (1996–1998)
 – Pero Sugimoto (1996–1999)
Salad Days – Shinobu Inokuma (1997–1998) (moved to Weekly Shōnen Sunday)
 – Takashi Hashiguchi (1997–2001)
 – Reiji Yamada (1997) (moved from Weekly Shōnen Sunday) 
 – Mondo Takimura (1998)
 – Michiteru Kusaba (1999)
 – Makoto Raiku (1999–2000)
 – Syun Matsuena (1999–2002)
 – Ryō Ōkuma (2000–2001)
Heat Wave – Kazurou Inoue (2001)
 – Kei Kusunoki (2001–2002)
 – Taishi Mori (2001–2002)
 – Yōhei Suginobu (2002)
 – Shun Fujiki (2003) (moved to Weekly Shōnen Sunday)
Peace Maker – Shūichirō Satō (2003–2004)

2009–2019
 – Tsubasa Fukuchi (2009–2011)
 – Shirō Otsuka (2009–2011)
 – Toshihiko Kurazono (2009–2011)
 – Eko Yamatoya (2009)
 – Takeshi Azuma (2009–2011)
Ping Pong Rush – Aiko Koyama (2009–2010)
Undead – Masashi Terajima (2009–2010)
 – Hiro Kashiwaba (2009–2011)
 – Fujiminosuke Yorozuya (2009–2013)
 – Hiroshi Fukuda (2009–2010)
 – Kazurou Inoue (2009–2011)
 – Haro Aso (2010–2015) (moved to Weekly Shōnen Sunday)
 – Hiroshi Nakanishi (art), Hajime Yatate, Yoshiyuki Tomino (original) (2012)
 – Romeo Tanaka (original story) and Kōichirō Hoshino (art) (2012–2013)
 – Wakō Honna (2012–2014) (moved to Weekly Shōnen Sunday)
 – Jun Sakura (2012–2013) (moved to Weekly Shōnen Sunday)
 – Rokurō Ōgaki (2013–2015)
 – Akira (original story) and Akira Nishikawa (art) (2013) (moved from Weekly Shōnen Sunday)
 – Koroku Inumura (original story) and Takeshi Kojima (art) (2014–2015)
 – Nekoguchi (2015) (moved to Weekly Shōnen Sunday)
 – Masasumi Kakizaki (2015–2018) (moved from Weekly Shōnen Sunday)
 – Tenya (2015–2021)
 – Kazurou Inoue (2016–2018)
 – Level-5 (original) and sho.t (2017–2018)
 by (2018–2022)
 by Hiroyuki Nishimori (2018–2019)
 – Chihiro Kurachi (2019–2021)

2020–present
 – Yutaka Abe (story) and Jirō Maruden (art) (2020–2021)
 by Yuki Shoyo (2020–2021)
 by Yutaka Abe and Jirō Maruden (art) (2021–2022)

References

External links
 

1978 establishments in Japan
Magazines established in 1978
Magazines published in Tokyo
Monthly manga magazines published in Japan
Shogakukan magazines
Shōnen manga magazines